Badshah Nagar is a residential area in trans-gomti of Lucknow near Badshah Nagar railway station.

Most of the buildings in Badshah Nagar are constructed by the government for its employees. Apart from residential buildings there are some commercial constructions also present. Badshah nagar postal/
zip/pincode number
is 226007.

Neighbourhoods in Lucknow